Cedars may refer to:

 Cedar (plant), including a list of trees and plants known as cedar
 Cedars (album), an album released in 2003 by English band Clearlake
 Cedars (immigration detention), facility in the UK
 Cedars-Sinai Medical Center, Los Angeles, California
 Cedars, Pennsylvania
 Cedars, Dallas, Texas, a neighborhood
 Cedars Hospital, on the soap opera Guiding Light
 The Cedars, nickname of the Lebanon national rugby league team

See also
 Cedar (disambiguation)
 The Cedars (disambiguation)